Beyond the Dancing is the debut studio album by Australian country singer Troy Cassar-Daley. The album was released in January 1995.

At the ARIA Music Awards of 1995 the album won Best Country Album. 
At the 1996 Country Music Awards of Australia, Cassar-Daley won Best Male Vocalist for his track "End of the Road".

Track listing

Release history

References

External links
Interview with Troy on WHO.com

1995 albums
Troy Cassar-Daley albums
ARIA Award-winning albums